Arnside is a village and civil parish in Cumbria, historically part of Westmorland, near the border with Lancashire, England. The Lake District National Park is located a few miles North. In the 2001 census the parish had a population of 2,301, increasing at the 2011 census to 2,334.

It faces the estuary of the River Kent on the north-eastern corner of Morecambe Bay, within the Arnside and Silverdale Area of Outstanding Natural Beauty and is overlooked by Arnside Knott, a hill that rises out of the estuary. Up to the 19th century, the village was a port, but building the viaduct caused the estuary to silt up.
A detailed account of the wildlife of the Arnside and Silverdale AONB is provided by John Wilson and Peter Lennon. Mammals include red squirrel and otter, breeding birds at the time of publication included the bittern which is still found in the area.

The village has been attractive to visitors since the 19th century but never developed as a traditional seaside resort. Writing in The Local Historian, Caunce describes it as "an unwitting pioneer of eco-tourism", with visitors attracted by the scenery and in particular Arnside Knott.

Buildings

The oldest building in the parish is Arnside Tower, a Peel tower built in the 14th/15th century as a refuge against raids from Scots and the Border Reivers.

The now defunct Arnside Golf Club was founded in 1906, the club closed around World War II.

The former customs house is now occupied by the Sailing Club, and many of the buildings on the promenade were built as accommodation for visitors.

Arnside viaduct

Governance

Arnside  is part of the Westmorland and Lonsdale parliamentary constituency, for which Tim Farron has been the MP since 2005, representing the Liberal Democrats.

Before Brexit, it was in the North West England European Parliamentary Constituency.

For local government purposes, it is in the Arnside + Milnthorpe Ward of South Lakeland District Council and the Kent Estuary Division of Cumbria County Council.

The civil parish of Arnside includes the hamlet of Far Arnside as well as the village of Arnside. The parish is bordered by the Kent estuary to the north, Morecambe Bay to the west, Silverdale to the south (along the historic Westmorland / Lancashire county boundary), and Beetham to the east ( the eastern boundary following the railway at its north and south, and extending a little further east). The parish has its own parish council, Arnside Parish Council.

Transport
The Furness Line passes over the River Kent via the Arnside Viaduct.

The village is connected to Kendal by the 551 and 552 bus services.

Tides

With each high tide, the coast of Arnside is subjected to a very fast rising tide. Because of the potential danger warning notices are posted at the pier, and an audible warning is sounded before every high tide (in daylight). The sequence of warnings is:-
 Eight sounds on the siren - around 2.25 h before high tide
 Eight sounds on the siren - around 1.75 h before high tide
 Twelve sounds on the siren - around 1.25 h before high tide, when the incoming tide is just visible from the Coastguard station (location of the siren  )

Notable people
Robert Wilson (1922-1980), first-class cricketer and Royal Air Force officer

See also

Listed buildings in Arnside
St James' Church, Arnside

Image gallery

References

External links

 Arnside Gateway - local on-line resources
 Arnside Photos Photos of Arnside
 Cumbria County History Trust: Arnside (nb: provisional research only – see Talk page)
 . This is from the Ordnance Survey of Westmorland. (The view  of Lancashire and Furness is misleading - it was outside the surveyors' area and they have left it as an outline only.)

 
Villages in Cumbria
Westmorland
Populated coastal places in Cumbria
Civil parishes in Cumbria
South Lakeland District
Morecambe Bay
Articles containing video clips